MSP Velayutha Nadar Lakshmithaiammal Polytechnic College is a polytechnic college offering Diploma courses. Situated at Sivagamipuram, Pavoorchatram, Tirunelveli District, Tamil Nadu, it was established in 1985 by MSPV Charities Trust. Four of its seven courses are accredited for three years by National Board of Accreditation, AICTE, New Delhi. The College is ISO 9001:2008 certified by BSI, India.

References

Colleges in Tamil Nadu
Education in Tirunelveli district
Educational institutions established in 1985
1985 establishments in Tamil Nadu